Lohvynenko, also transliterated Logvynenko or Logvinenko, is a Ukrainian surname. Notable people with the surname include:

 Alina Lohvynenko (born 1990), Ukrainian athlete
 Bohdan Lohvynenko (born 1988), Ukrainian writer
 Oleksiy Logvynenko (1946–2016), Ukrainian translator
 Marina Logvinenko (born 1961), Russian sport shooter
 Yury Logvinenko (born 1988), Kazakhstani footballer

See also
 
 

Ukrainian-language surnames